Jie Ma is a traditional Chinese musician who plays the pipa.

References

External links
 https://web.archive.org/web/20110714022515/http://www.majiepipa.com/bio.htm
 https://www.theguardian.com/music/2009/apr/20/hey-whats-that-sound-pipa
 https://web.archive.org/web/20101112175800/http://meridiangallery.org/en/concert/earth_music.htm
 https://web.archive.org/web/20100808155311/http://www.freddyclarke.com/wobbly-world

1978 births
Living people
People's Republic of China musicians
Pipa players
People from Lanzhou
Academic staff of Liaoning Normal University
Educators from Gansu
Musicians from Gansu
Tianjin Conservatory of Music alumni